Toulx-Sainte-Croix is a commune in the Creuse department in the Nouvelle-Aquitaine region in central France.

Geography

Population

Sights

 Several Roman remains.
 The church and its separate bell tower, dating from the eleventh century.
 The ancient stone cross on the square.
 Megaliths known as "Les Pierres Jaumâtres".
 A fifteenth-century château at the hamlet of Maisons.
 A fortified manorhouse at Chanon.
 The observation tower constructed in 1932 by Abbé Aguillaume.

See also
Communes of the Creuse department

References

External links

 Gallery of photos of the Pierres Jaumâtres

Communes of Creuse